Parliamentary elections were held in Bulgaria on 18 November 1923. They followed a coup in June that had overthrown the Bulgarian Agrarian National Union government led by Aleksandar Stamboliyski, which had been elected in April. The result was a victory for the Democratic Alliance, which won 200 of the 247 seats. Voter turnout was 86%.

Results

References

Bulgaria
1923 11
Bulgaria
Parliamentary 2